Global Warning is a 2008 release by Jon Oliva's Pain. It is the band's third studio release. The record reached number 11 in the German MRC Rock Radio Charts during March 2008.

On February 7, 2008, the initial track list of the album was posted at the band's forums. On February 8, five song samples from said track list were posted on the band's MySpace page. In support of the album, the band announced a tour of the United States and Europe, with support on the European dates coming from Manticora and Masterstroke. The US tour was scheduled with support from Circle II Circle and Manticora. The tour with both JOP and CIIC would mean that Jon Oliva and Zachary Stevens were on the same bill for the first time since Savatage's 1999 tour.

The record features a guest appearance by Ralph Santolla on two tracks: "Adding the Cost" and "You Never Know". The track "Before I Hang" is made up of two previous Savatage songs—the original "Before I Hang" (of which a demo was released on The Dungeons Are Calling Silver Edition in 2002) as well as Streets lost track "Larry Elbows". The album also features a tribute to the band's former producer, Greg Marchak, who died prior to the album's release, entitled "O to G".

Track listing

Personnel
Jon Oliva – lead vocals, keyboards
Matt LaPorte – guitars
Kevin Rothney – bass
John Zahner – keyboards
Christopher Kinder – drums
Ralph Santolla – guitars (on "Adding the Cost" and "You Never Know")

Further credits
 Recorded at Morrisound Studios and Shabbey Road Studios
 Produced by Christopher Kinder and Jon Oliva
 Co-produced by Tom Morris, Matt LaPorte and Jim Morris
 Engineered by Tom Morris and Christopher Kinder
 Assistant engineer: Jason Blackerby
 Mixed by Jim Morris
 Mastered by Jim Morris and Christopher Kinder
 Spiritual and technical guidance: Greg "Super G" Marchak and Criss Oliva
 Photography by Kim Grillo
 Artwork design by Thomas Ewerhard

References

External links
 Jon Oliva's Pain's official website
 Jon Oliva's Pain's at MySpace (with track samples of the album posted)

2008 albums
Jon Oliva's Pain albums
AFM Records albums